Mocoa (Kamsá: Shatjok) is a municipality and capital city of the department of Putumayo in Colombia.

The city is located in the northwest of the Putumayo department. The municipality borders the departments of Nariño to the west and Cauca to the north.

On March 31, 2017, mudslides in Mocoa left more than 254 people dead, and hundreds missing.

References

External links
  Mocoa official website
  Mocoa official website 2
  Territorial-Environmental Information System of Colombian Amazon SIAT-AC website

Municipalities of Putumayo Department
Capitals of Colombian departments